Take or The Take may refer to:

 Take, a single continuous recorded performance
 Take (hunting), any action that adversely affects a species

Film
 The Take (1974 film) a crime thriller
 Take (film), a 2007 crime thriller
 The Take (2004 film), a documentary about workers reclaiming factories
 The Take (2007 film), a crime drama film
 The Take (2016 film) or Bastille Day, an action film starring Idris Elba

Music
 The Take (Melbourne band), a post-punk band from Melbourne, Australia
 The Take (Welsh band), a punk rock band
 Take (band), a South Korean duo
 Take (album), a 2020 album by South Korean rapper Mino

Other uses
 The Take (YouTube channel), a YouTube channel and media company
 The Take (TV series), a 2009 British series
 The Take (novel), a novel by Martina Cole, basis for the TV series
 Japanese destroyer Take, two ships of the Japanese Navy
Take or o-take, Japanese bamboo
The Take (Web/TV series), an ongoing movie review web series from Mailfern that also airs on Oakland University Television.
 The Take (podcast), An Al Jazeera podcast

See also
 Taken (disambiguation)
 Acquisition (disambiguation)
 Hot take